Re'im (lit. Friends) is a secular kibbutz in southern Israel, and one of the Gaza vicinity villages. Located at the confluence of Besor Stream and Gerar Stream in the north-western Negev desert, it falls under the jurisdiction of Eshkol Regional Council.

Re'im was founded in 1949 by members of the Israel Boy and Girl Scouts Federation who were demobilized from the Palmach.

Geography
Re'im is located between roads 232 and 234 in the western Negev, next to the Re'im Junction and Gama Junction. The ruins of ancient Gama (Tell Jemmeh) are located to the west of the kibbutz. West of Re'im is the kibbutz Kissufim, and north is Be'eri. Re'im's elevation is 50 m above sea level, and the Besor Stream passes through its territory.

History
The kibbutz was established in 1949 by former Palmach members with the provisional name HaTzofim Vav (lit. Scouts F). It was then named Tel Re'im (lit. Hill of Friends) after the Arabic translation of the nearby archaeological site of Tell Jemmeh. It was eventually renamed Re'im in memory of members of the Gar'in who were killed in the 1948 Arab–Israeli War. The name, meaning 'friends', was taken from the Book of Proverbs (18:24) to symbolize them.

The kibbutz was planned by the architect Hanan Habaron, one of the founders of the kibbutz and a member until his death in 2002. The ascetic style was described as a visual expression of Habaron's social and architectural worldviews. Asaf Kashtan, an Israeli architect who wrote a book about Habaron, said that in recent years, Habaron's style fell out of favor with Re'im's residents.

The Israel Defense Forces (IDF) has a base near the kibbutz. Prior to the Israeli disengagement from Gaza in 2005, the base was used as a camp for the evacuating troops.  After the disengagement, Re'im became the target of Qassam rockets fired at it from the Gaza Strip. In 2008, IDF troops at the nearby base near Nahal Oz requested that the base be relocated to the area near Re'im, away from the range of Hamas' mortar fire.

Economy
The kibbutz's economy is based on agriculture and its laser factory, Isralaser. IsraBig, which manufactures dies for stamping, also has a factory in Re'im. The kibbutz also has a room letting business, including a Bedouin accommodation tent. It suffered as a result of the Israel-Gaza conflict, and the kibbutz lowered its prices. In 2008, Re'im embarked on a project that would make it the first community in Israel, and perhaps in the entire world, to rely entirely on solar energy for domestic consumption. Sunday, a company which markets the technology in Israel, is to install solar panels on all 130 rooftops in the kibbutz. The cost of the project is estimated at NIS 60–100 million and the investment is expected to pay for itself in 10 years. The cost and revenues from electricity are to be divided evenly between the kibbutz and Sunday, and any excess energy is to be sold to the Israel Electric Company.

References

External links
Official website 
Re'im Negev Information Center

Kibbutzim
Kibbutz Movement
Populated places established in 1949
Gaza envelope
Populated places in Southern District (Israel)
1949 establishments in Israel